Governor James may refer to:

Arthur James (politician) (1883–1973), 31st Governor of Pennsylvania
Fob James (born 1934), 48th Governor of Alabama
Frederick Seton James (1870–1934), Governor of the Windward Islands from 1924 to 1930
William H. James (1831–1920), Acting Governor of Nebraska